Kremmen station is a railway station in the municipality of Kremmen, located in the Oberhavel district in Brandenburg, Germany.

References

Railway stations in Brandenburg
Buildings and structures in Oberhavel